Baigua Airport was an agricultural airstrip near the hamlet of Baigue, in the La Altagracia Province of the Dominican Republic.

Google Earth Historical Imagery (4/11/2014) shows a  gravel runway with a small service building alongside. Trees are beginning to grow in spots along its length. The (4/13/2018) image shows the service building has been demolished and the trees are well developed and encroaching the runway centerline.

See also

Transport in Dominican Republic
List of airports in Dominican Republic

References

External links 
OpenStreetMap - Baigua Airport
SkyVector - Baigua Airport

Defunct airports
Airports in the Dominican Republic
Buildings and structures in La Altagracia Province